Arcade Classic is a series of five compilations of arcade games for Game Boy released in 1995. The first four were published by Nintendo, while the fifth was developed and published by Black Pearl Software. Each cartridge includes two games.

Arcade Classic No. 1: Asteroids / Missile Command
Arcade Classic No. 2: Centipede / Millipede
Arcade Classic No. 3: Galaga / Galaxian
Arcade Classic No. 4: Defender / Joust
Arcade Classics: Super Breakout / Battlezone

References

Game Boy games
1995 video games
Atari video game compilations
Midway video game compilations
Namco games
Bandai Namco video game compilations
Video games developed in Japan